Caroline Wozniacki was the defending champion, but was not allowed to participate because there were already two top 6 players in the draw.

Serena Williams won the title, defeating Lucie Šafářová in the final 6–0, 6–1.

Seeds
The top eight seeds received a bye into the second round.

  Agnieszka Radwańska (withdrew because of a back injury)
  Samantha Stosur (semifinals)
  Marion Bartoli (third round)
  Vera Zvonareva (quarterfinals)
  Serena Williams (champion)
  Sabine Lisicki (quarterfinals, retired because of a left ankle injury)
  Jelena Janković (second round)
  Anastasia Pavlyuchenkova (third round)
  Lucie Šafářová (final)
  Anabel Medina Garrigues (second round)
  Christina McHale (first round)
  Yanina Wickmayer (second round)
  Nadia Petrova (quarterfinals)
  Polona Hercog (semifinals)
  Chanelle Scheepers (first round)
  Jarmila Gajdošová (first round)
  Marina Erakovic (third round)

Draw

Finals

Top half

Section 1

Section 2

Bottom half

Section 3

Section 4

Qualifying

Seeds

Qualifiers

Draw

First qualifier

Second qualifier

Third qualifier

Fourth qualifier

Fifth qualifier

Sixth qualifier

Seventh qualifier

Eighth qualifier

Ninth qualifier

Tenth qualifier

Eleventh qualifier

Twelfth qualifier

References

External links
 Main draw 
 Qualifying draw

Family Circle Cup - Singles
Charleston Open